Blue Murder is a British crime drama television series based in Manchester, originally broadcast on ITV from 2003 until 2009, starring Caroline Quentin as DCI Janine Lewis and Ian Kelsey as DI Richard Mayne. Five series of the programme were broadcast over the course of six years. Reruns have aired on ITV3.

Background
Blue Murder centres on a single mother of four, DCI Janine Lewis (Caroline Quentin), trying to balance a demanding career with raising her young family, whilst constantly battling with her former husband, who has since started a new family of his own.

The series was created by Cath Staincliffe, a novelist and radio playwright. Staincliffe pitched the idea for Blue Murder to ITV and a two-part first series was commissioned by the network. The first series began broadcasting on 18 May 2003. Due to strong ratings, a second series of four episodes was subsequently commissioned and began broadcasting in 2004. Staincliffe was principal writer for the first two series, with John Fay, Jeff Povey and Matthew Hall also contributing scripts for the second series.

The fifth and final series debuted on 7 September 2009. The series was regarded by the cast as the best series yet, and Quentin described the series as having "finally cracked it". The final series included a number of guest stars Mark Benton, Lee Boardman, Kieran O'Brien, Brendan Coyle, Heather Peace, Tina O'Brien, Sylvia Syms and Anthony Flanagan.

Cast
 Caroline Quentin as DCI Janine Lewis
 Ian Kelsey as DI Richard Mayne
 Nicholas Murchie as DS Tony Shap
 Paul Loughran as DS Ian Butchers
 Rhea Bailey as DC Lisa Goodall (Series 3–4)
 Belinda Everett as DC Kat Skerton (Series 5)
 David Schofield as DCS James Hackett (Series 1–2)
 Saskia Wickham as DCS Louise Hogg (Series 3–5)
 Ceallach Spellman as Tom Lewis
 Catherine Jenkins as Eleanor Lewis (Series 1–2)
 Eden Garrity as Ellie Lewis (Series 3–5)
 Joe Tucker as Pete Lewis (Series 1–4)
 Geoff Breton as Michael Lewis

Series overview

Episode list

Series 1 (2003)
Blue Murder began as two 90-minute (advertisements included) episodes first shown in May 2003, which gained enough viewers for a full series. This two-part pilot later became known as series one and released as such on DVD in the UK.

Series 2 (2004)

Series 3 (2006)
Roy Mitchell also contributed to the script for episode one, "Steady Eddie".

Series 4 (2007)

Series 5 (2009)
Beginning with this series, the format changed from 90-minute episodes to 60-minute episodes.

References

External links

2003 British television series debuts
2009 British television series endings
2000s British crime drama television series
2000s British mystery television series
2000s British police procedural television series
2000s British workplace drama television series
British detective television series
English-language television shows
ITV crime dramas
ITV mystery shows
Murder in television
Television shows produced by Granada Television
Television series by ITV Studios
Television shows set in Manchester